Bottega Veneta is an Italian luxury fashion house based in Milan, Italy. Its product lines include ready-to-wear, handbags, shoes, accessories, and jewelry; and it licenses its name and branding to Coty, Inc. for fragrances.

History

Founding to 1990s 
Bottega Veneta was established in 1966 in Vicenza, Italy by Michele Taddei and Renzo Zengiaro. Crafting artisanal leather goods, the brand developed a distinctive leather weaving design, the Intrecciato, which instantly became Bottega Veneta's iconic look. "When your own initials are enough" became the brand's historic slogan because the crafted Intrecciato made Bottega Veneta's products immediately recognizable, and its logo only appeared discreetly on the inside of its products.

In 1972, Bottega Veneta opened its first store in the USA, in New York City. In the mid-1970s, the company started to make shoes.

Renzo Zengiaro left the company at the end of the 1970s. Soon after, Michele Taddei handed over the company to his ex-wife Laura Braggion, who headed the company with her second husband Vittorio Moltedo from then on. She moved to New York to develop the company and became a member of the local jetset. In 1980, the actress Lauren Hutton carried a Bottega Veneta Intrecciato bag in the movie American Gigolo. In 1985, Andy Warhol made the short film Bottega Veneta Industrial Videotape.

During the 1990s, Bottega Veneta launched its first ready-to-wear collection.

2000 to present 
In February 2001, Gucci a subsidiary of Kering, acquired Bottega Veneta for $156 million. The following May, Patrizio di Marco was appointed CEO, and in June Tomas Maier creative director. Vogue coined the term “stealth wealth” to describe the brand's new style.

The brand launched a fashion jewellery line in 2002, followed by a fine jewellery line in 2006. By 2005, the company was profitable again. From 2001 to 2010, Bottega Veneta's sales grew 15-fold. Bottega Veneta presented its first women ready-to-wear runway show in February 2005 and its first men runway show in June 2006. In January 2009, Marco Bizzarri succeeded to Patrizio di Marco as CEO of Bottega Veneta. In June 2011, Bottega Veneta launched its first women's fragrance Eau de Parfum. In 2012, Bottega Veneta's sales reached the $1 billion mark.

In 2006, Bottega Veneta launched a 3-year, tuition-free training program in partnership with the 4-century-old Scuola d'Arte e Mestieri di Vicenza. Bottega Veneta launched the Women's Mountain Cooperatives in 2011, independent artisanal leather workshops for unemployed women of the Alto Astico and Posina mountain community. Bottega Veneta opened a first manufacturing site Manifattura Veneta Pelletterie in Altavilla Vicentina in 2011, and a second in Malo in 2012. In 2011, La Scuola dei Maestri Pellettieri di Bottega Veneta created a 3-month post-graduate course with the Università Iuav di Venezia to train students to advanced handbag design and product development.

In 2013, Bottega Veneta moved its atelier from Vicenza to a historic 18th-century villa surrounded by a 590,000-square-foot park near Montebello Vicentino. The renovation of the property underwent a strict environmental process. Bottega Veneta also opened its first flagship store, a 11,448 square-foot boutique in a historical building on Via Sant'Andrea in Milan. In April 2014, Marco Bizzarri stepped down as CEO of Bottega Veneta and Carlo Alberto Beretta became the company's new CEO in January 2015.

In 2016, the brand's second flagship store opened on North Rodeo Drive in Beverly Hills. The company announced it would unify its men and women's shows. During the company's 50th anniversary show at the Accademia di Brera, the Bottega Veneta clutch bag carried by Lauren Hutton in the 1980 movie American Gigolo was revived (and renamed The Lauren 1980). In October 2016, Claus-Dietrich Lahrs was appointed CEO of Bottega Veneta. In 2018, Bottega Veneta opened a 6-floor flagship store in Ginza, Tokyo, in a building designed as a tribute to the capital's architectural modernism. In January 2018, Bottega Veneta opened a 15,000-square-foot store - its third flagship store - on the corner of Madison and 64th Street in New York City. In June 2018, Tomas Maier stepped down as creative director of Bottega Veneta.

Daniel Lee 
In June 2018, Kering appointed Daniel Lee as creative director of Bottega Veneta. Lee launched the Pouch clutch bag which became the fastest selling bag in the history of the brand. He maintained the brand's emphasis on well-crafted, logo-less and simplicity-driven products. The brand is also credited with reviving the trend for square-toe heels.

In June 2019, Kering appointed Bartolomeo Rongone as CEO of Bottega Veneta. The company announced the opening of a third, 64,583-foot-square Manifattura Veneta Pelletterie site in Dueville and opened its first store in Miami (the first under the direction of Daniel Lee). In 2019, Bottega Veneta won four awards during the British Fashion Awards. By the end of 2019, as the sales of Gucci started to deflate, Bottega Veneta turned into Kering's next rising star. In 2020, Bottega Veneta's sales reached 1.140 billion euros.

On the 6th January 2021, Bottega Veneta created a buzz in the luxury industry by unexpectedly shutting down its social media accounts. The move was followed by the creation of a digital journal, Issued by Bottega, leaving Bottega Veneta to rely on clients, influencers, collaborators, and fans to spread the company's news. Monthly fashion shows were replaced by private staged trunk shows called Salons. The fashion house reinvented its shows with industrial setups and hip-hop guest stars.

In April 2021, the Berlin police investigated Bottega Veneta's Salon afterparty. Following the show held at Berghain, the party held at the Soho House (club) had little social distancing or masking during the height of the COVID-19 pandemic.

On November 10, 2021, Bottega Veneta and Lee announced Lee would be leaving his post as creative director in a "joint decision to end their collaboration."

Matthieu Blazy 
In late 2021, Kering appointed Matthieu Blazy, former design director at Bottega Veneta, as the new creative director of the company, who is expected to maintain Lee's New Bottega style. Under Blazy, Bottega Veneta shows returned to Milan and the company revealed plans to move its headquarters into Milan's Palazzo San Fedele before the end of 2023.

Corporate structure 
CEOs

 2001–2008: Patrizio di Marco
 2009–2014: Marco Bizzarri
 2015–2016: Carlo Beretta
 2016–2019: Claus-Dietrich Lahrs
 Since 2019: Bartolomeo Rongone

Creative directors

 1966–1970s: Renzo Zengiaro
 1980s–2001: Laura Braggion
 2001–2018: Tomas Maier
 2018–2021: Daniel Lee
 Since 2021: Matthieu Blazy

Sponsoring
Bottega Veneta has sponsored the Venice Dance Biennale since 2021 and the Festival de Hyères since 2022.

Bibliography

References

External links 

 
 Issued by Bottega, the brand's online magazine

Italian brands
Clothing retailers of Italy
Shoe companies of Italy
Fashion accessory brands
High fashion brands
Jewellery retailers of Italy
Luxury brands
Perfume houses
Italian suit makers
Watch brands
Watch manufacturing companies of Italy
Companies based in Milan
Design companies established in 1966
Clothing companies established in 1966
Retail companies established in 1966
Italian companies established in 1966
Kering brands
Clothing brands of Italy